Omar Ali Saifuddien Mosque (Jawi: مسجد عمر علي سيف الدين) is a mosque in Bandar Seri Begawan, the capital of Brunei. It is one of the country's two  or national mosques (the other Jame' Asr Hassanil Bolkiah Mosque), as well as a national landmark. It is one of the largest and oldest mosques in the country and is named after Omar Ali Saifuddien III (1914–1986), the 28th Sultan of Brunei and the father of the current monarch Sultan Hassanal Bolkiah. The mosque serves as a symbol of the Islamic faith in Brunei.

Construction 
The mosque took almost five years to build and cost more than £1 million at that time.

The architectural firm involved in the construction was the Malaysia-based Booty Edwards & Partners, whereas the consulting firm was the Singapore-based Steen, Sehested and Partners.

The construction work began on 4 February 1954. The construction uses 1,500 tons of concrete and 700 tons of steel.

The mosque was inaugurated on 26 September 1958 in conjunction with the 42nd birthday celebration of Sultan Omar Ali Saifuddien III.

Architecture 
The mosque is influenced by Mughal architecture. It was accounted that the design was first conceptualised by Sultan Omar Ali Saifuddien III and then developed by the commissioned architect Rudolfo Nolli, an Italian sculptor and decorative stonework contractor.

The dome is covered with gold. The floors and columns were built of marble from Italy at a cost of S$200,000. The interior is also lighted by an addition of more than 480 tubes. The floors were covered with Axminster carpets, handmade from Belgium and Saudi Arabia.

The mosque sits on a  site and almost surrounded by a man-made lagoon. In the middle of the lagoon sits an artificial barge called  in which the design is meant to resemble a ship of Sultan Bolkiah, a Sultan of Brunei who reigned in the 16th century. It was inaugurated on 19 December 1967 in conjunction with the 1,400th anniversary of Nuzul Al-Quran, a holiday in the Islamic calendar which commemorates the revelation of the first verses of the Qur'an. Built at a cost of B$500,000 at that time, the barge was intended to be a permanent venue for various national Islamic religious events.

References

External links 

 Omar Ali Saifuddien Mosque on the Ministry of Religious Affairs' website 
 Sultan Omar Ali Saifuddien Mosque by Rozan Yunos on BRUNEIresources.com

1958 establishments in Brunei
Mosques completed in 1958
Mosques in Brunei
Buildings and structures in Bandar Seri Begawan